34th Army may refer to:

34th Army (Soviet Union)
Thirty-Fourth Army (Japan), a unit of the Imperial Japanese Armynew